Joseph Augustine Cushman (January 31, 1881 – April 16, 1949) was an American geologist, paleontologist and foraminiferologist.

Biography

He was born on January 31, 1881, in Bridgewater, Massachusetts, the son of Darius and Jane  (Fuller) Cushman. His primary education took place at Bridgewater Normal School, graduating in 1901. He was the captain and catcher for the baseball team along with fullback and manager for the football team. Later he was educated at Harvard University, where he received a B.S. in 1903, conferred magna cum laude.

In October 1903, he married Alice Edna Wilson, with whom he had three children, Robert, Alice and Ruth, born in 1905, 1907 and 1910, respectively.

He became a curator at the Boston Natural History Museum, working part-time so he could attend graduate school. He was awarded his Ph.D. from Harvard in 1909. His wife, Alice, died in January 1912; by September 1913, he had remarried to Frieda Gerlach Billings. In 1913 he became the director of the Boston Natural History Museum. The same year he remarried.

Next to his home in Sharon, Massachusetts, he constructed a building that would become the Cushman Laboratory for Foraminiferal Research in 1923. In his laboratory he worked as a consultant for oil companies, as well as teaching classes in micropaleontology and performing research. He specialized in the study of marine protozoans (Foraminifera) and became the foremost foraminiferologist of the first half of the twentieth century. He was aided in his laboratory by members of his family and many of foreign collaborators, including Ozawa Yoshiaki. During his career he published over 500 papers.

He died of bladder cancer on April 16, 1949, aged 68, at his Sharon, Massachusetts, home, and was buried in Great Hills Cemetery, which is located in Boston Ma. His work was continued by his assistant and collaborator, M. Ruth Todd.

Joseph Augustine Cushman is a founding father of Kappa Delta Phi National Fraternity.

Bibliography
 Cushman, J.A., "Foraminifera, Their Classification and Economic Use", 1928, Sharon, Massachusetts. —via Internet Archive (at least 4 revised editions followed)

Awards and honors
 The Joseph A. Cushman award is given for Outstanding Achievement in Foraminiferal Research.
 The wrinkle ridge Dorsum Cushman on the Moon is named after him.

References

External links
 
 Cushman Foundation
 Cushman Founding Father of Kappa Delta Phi

1881 births
1949 deaths
Harvard University alumni
20th-century American geologists
American paleontologists
Deaths from bladder cancer
Micropaleontologists
Deaths from cancer in Massachusetts